Trouty, Newfoundland and Labrador is a small settlement on the Bonavista Peninsula. It is located in Trinity Bay, southwest of Catalina. It had a population of 178 in 1956.

See also
 List of communities in Newfoundland and Labrador

Populated places in Newfoundland and Labrador